Marie Wallin is a British fibre artist and fashion designer known for her colorful fair isle designs. After working as a Head Designer for Rowan for many years, she became a successful freelance knitwear designer.

Education
Wallin got a first class degree in textiles at Leicester Polytechnic, now DeMontfort University in 1986. Her final collection was inspired by artist Piet Mondrian.

Career 
After finishing her education, Wallin worked for a small knitwear company in Nottingham. A year later she started her own business selling machine knitted designs internationally.

From the mid-1990s she started working in the commercial knitwear industry again, before joining yarn company Rowan as Head Designer. In this position she was responsible for designing handknits, but also photoshoots and the general creative direction. She became known for her colorful fair isle designs during this time.

In 2013, Wallin started her own business as a freelance knitwear designer. She has since published many books and released her own yarn British Breeds, spun by John Arbon Textiles. All of the designs in her books are modelled by actress/model Georgia Scarlet Waters. Wallin says that she "doesn't really stop working" and knits something work-related every night.

In 2014, a fair isle throw designed by Wallin was featured in the exhibition Wool Collection: Interiors for the fifth annual UK Wool Week.

Wallin's designs have been praised by designer Kate Davies and she was interviewed twice by the podcast Fruity Knitting. According to the knitting pattern database Ravelry, her patterns have been published in at least 290 different magazine issues, such as Simply Knit, Simply Crochet, Rowan Magazine, Suuri Käsityö, Stitches, The Knitter and many more.

Personal life
Wallin grew up in an artistic family and was taught to draw and paint by her father as a child.

Published Works

 Wallin, Marie (2013). Windswept: Collection One, Marie Wallin Designs. 
 Wallin, Marie (2014). Lakeland: Collection Two, Marie Wallin Designs. 
 Wallin, Marie (2015). Filigree: Collection Three, Marie Wallin Designs. 
 Wallin, Marie (2015). Once Upon a Time: Collection Four, Marie Wallin Designs. 
 Wallin, Marie (2015). Autumn: Collection Five, Marie Wallin Designs. 
 Wallin, Marie (2016). Spring Time: Collection Six, Marie Wallin Designs. 
 Wallin, Marie (2016). Winter Crochet: Collection Seven, Marie Wallin Designs. 
 Wallin, Marie (2017). North Sea: Collection Eight, Marie Wallin Designs. 
 Wallin, Marie (2017). Shetland, Marie Wallin Designs. 
 Wallin, Marie (2018). Bloomsbury: Collection Nine, Marie Wallin Designs. 
 Wallin, Marie (2018). Wildwood, Marie Wallin Designs. 
 Wallin, Marie (2019). Meadow, Marie Wallin Designs. 
 Wallin, Marie (2019). Gentle, Marie Wallin Designs.

References

External links
 
 First interview for the podcast Fruity Knitting 
 Second interview for the podcast Fruity Knitting
 Designer profile at Rowan

Year of birth missing (living people)
Living people
People in knitting
British textile artists
Women textile artists
21st-century women textile artists
21st-century textile artists
British fashion designers
British women fashion designers